The Vinyl Institute (VI) is a U.S. industry trade group representing manufacturers of vinyl, vinyl chloride monomer, vinyl additives and modifiers, and vinyl packaging materials. It was established in 1982 and is headquartered in Arlington, Virginia.

Films
2002 - Blue Vinyl

External links
The Vinyl Institute official site

Organizations established in 1982
Organizations based in Arlington County, Virginia
Vinyl polymers
Trade associations based in the United States
1982 establishments in Virginia